Esmaili Olya (also Romanized as Esma‘ili ‘Olya; also known as Esmā‘īlī Bālā, Esmā‘īlī-ye Bālā, and Esmā‘īlīyeh-ye ‘Olyā) is a village in Esmaili Rural District, Esmaili District, Anbarabad County, Kerman Province, Iran. At the 2006 census, its population was 209, in 37 families.

References 

Populated places in Anbarabad County